Marumba amboinicus is a species of moth of the family Sphingidae. It is known from Indonesia and the Philippines.

Subspecies
Marumba amboinicus amboinicus (Indonesia (Ceram, Ambon, Sulawesi, the Philippines) 
Marumba amboinicus celebensis Rothschild & Jordan, 1903 (Sulawesi) 
Marumba amboinicus luzoni Clark, 1935 (the Philippines)
Marumba amboinicus rothschildi Huwe, 1906 (Bacan)

References

Marumba
Moths described in 1861